Lanzelot is a 1969 opera by Paul Dessau to a libretto by Heiner Müller and Ginka Tsholakova. It premiered 19 December 1969. It was revived in 2019 in Weimar.

References

Operas by Paul Dessau
German-language operas
Operas
1969 operas